Lagarrigue Cove is a small cove south of Spigot Peak, Errera Channel, on the Danco Coast of Antarctica. The name was proposed by the Argentine navy and was approved by the Argentine geographical coordinating commission in 1956 to replace the provisional name "Puerto Lote". The cove was named in memory of a navy cook with the Argentine Antarctic Expedition of 1947–48 who perished in a crevasse accident in the vicinity.

References

Coves of Graham Land
Danco Coast